Thomas C. Clark High School is a public high school, in the Northside Independent School District, in San Antonio, Texas, United States. Built in 1978 with five main buildings surrounding a courtyard, this school has over 120 classrooms and is one of the largest schools in NISD. As with all Northside ISD schools, Clark is named for a former or current United States Supreme Court Justice, in this case Thomas C. Clark.

Clark serves the NISD portion of Scenic Oaks.

In 2017, the school was rated "Met Standard" by the Texas Education Agency, with a 5-Star Distinction for Academic Achievements in Mathematics, Science, Social Studies, Top 25 Percent Student Progress and Top 25 Percent Closing Performance Gaps. Also in 2017, Clark was ranked 7th out of 75 Greater San Antonio high schools in Children at Risk's School Rankings.

Programs
Clark is home to an award-winning fine arts department, which offers programs in Concert and Marching Band, Orchestra, Choir, Theatre, and Art.

Clark also offers athletic programs sanctioned by the University Interscholastic League. These include Football, Boys and Girls Basketball, Boys and Girls Soccer, Baseball, Volleyball, Track and Field, Swimming and Diving, Softball, Tennis, Golf, and Cross Country. Waterpolo was discontinued in 2012.

Clark also offers most, if not all, of the Academic UIL events, including Academic Decathlon, Social Studies, Science, Current Issues, One Act Play, Computer Science, Computer Applications, Calculator Applications, Literary Criticism, CX Debate, Lincoln-Douglas Debates, various speaking competitive events, various journalistic competitive events, and Air Force Junior ROTC.  Advanced Placement Courses: Human Geography, English Literature, English Composition, World History, U.S. History, European History, Environmental Science, U.S. Government, Microeconomics, Psychology, Biology, Chemistry, Physics 1 & 2, Physics C, Calculus AB, Calculus BC, Statistics, Computer Science, Art History, Studio Art, Spanish, French, German, Latin.

Academic awards
In 2013, Newsweek Magazine named Tom C. Clark High School one of their top 2,000 schools in the country; schools that have proven to be the most effective in turning out college-ready grads.

Athletics
The Clark Cougars compete in these sports:

Baseball
Basketball
Cross Country
Football
Golf
Soccer
Softball
Swimming and Diving
Tennis
Track and Field
Volleyball
Water Polo
Marching Band

Athletic highlights
Football: In the 2008–2009 football season, the Clark Cougars played in the 5A Texas Semi-Finals against F.B. Hightower, the farthest the school has ever advanced in the playoffs.

Tennis: District Champions of Northside Independent School District for 31 straight years.

Track and Field: 2012 – Men's district Champions in the 27-5A meet by one point over Brandeis High School.

Swimming: 2016 – Both men's and women's swim team crowned district champions

Notable alumni
Matt Beech (Class of 1990) — Former MLB baseball pitcher for the Philadelphia Phillies
Jason Brickman (Class of 2010) — Professional basketball player. NCAA fourth all-time in assists.
Jessica Collins (Class of 2001) — Actress
Wane McGarity (Class of 1995) — Former professional football player for the Dallas Cowboys and New Orleans Saints in the NFL, and the Calgary Stampeders and Winnipeg Blue Bombers (2005) of the CFL.
Trent Plaisted (Class of 2005) — Professional basketball player, drafted 46th overall in the 2008 NBA Draft.

References

External links
 Clark High School
 Clark High School band: "The Mighty Cougar Band"
 Clark Theatre website
 School sports website

High schools in San Antonio
Public high schools in Bexar County, Texas
Northside Independent School District high schools
1978 establishments in Texas